Luan Silva may refer to:
 Luan (footballer, born May 1993) (Luan da Conceição Silva), Brazilian footballer
 Luan Silva (footballer, born 1999), Brazilian footballer